Nilalang or   is a 2015 Filipino action horror film directed by Pedring Lopez starring Cesar Montano and Maria Ozawa. Nilalang is about a local forensic expert who teams up with an heiress to a transnational organized crime syndicate originating from Japan.

Plot
NBI special crimes division agent Tony (Cesar Montano) encounters an evil entity which is bent on killing and torturing beautiful women, one of which was his girlfriend, years after he thought to have killed the malevolent spirit. People close to Tony is in danger, including his partner Jane (Meg Imperial), who has romantic interest towards him with everyone in the agency aware of this fact except for Tony.

The spirit, who has killed many people in Japan, is thought to be targeting women from a certain clan of samurai. In Manila, Miyuki (Maria Ozawa) takes care of the family business while her younger sister is taking care of their aging father. Miyuki is later forced to help in the investigation regarding the murders after Akane went missing and their father was found dead to put a stop to the evil entity's killing spree.

Cast

Main cast
Cesar Montano as Tony
Maria Ozawa as Miyuki

Supporting cast
Meg Imperial as Jane
Yam Concepcion as Akane
Cholo Barretto as Totoy
Dido de la Paz as Col. Guevarra
Kiko Matos as Mark
Aubrey Miles as Tin (Tonyˈs Girlfriend)
Alexandre Charlet as Jean-Luc Lamy (French Interpol Agent)
Sonny Sison as Lord Ishijuki
Jeff Centauri as Miyuki's Yakuza Bodyguard
Khalil Ramos as Teenage Mark

Production

Casting
Robin Padilla was supposed to be Ozawa's leading man in this film but due to his wife Mariel Rodriguez's delicate pregnancy, he decided to back out to take care of his wife.

Release
Nilalang released its official trailer on October 12, 2015.

The film was released in the Philippines on December 25, 2015, Christmas Day, as part of the annual Metro Manila Film Festival.

Awards
The film won 5 awards during the 41st Metro Manila Film Festival including Best Cinematography , Best Visual Effects , Best Editing , Best Musical Score and Best Sound Engineering.

Controversy

Pullout from cinemas
After a day of screening, some cinemas started pulling out the film in favor of the two other blockbuster hit entries of the festival, My Bebe Love and Beauty and the Bestie. From a total of 40 theatres, the number of cinemas showing Nilalang went down to five. Because of this, the producers appealed to moviegoers and theatre owners to support the independent film the same way that they support the mainstream films of the festival. After this, the hashtag #DemandForNilalang became a trending topic on social media sites such as Twitter and Facebook, as interested movie goers urged cinema owners to screen the said film. After a few days, many theatre owners started including the film in their cinema line-up to give way to the public's request.

References

External links
 

2015 action thriller films
2015 films
Viva Films films
Philippine action thriller films
Philippine supernatural horror films
Films about spirit possession
Demons in film
Filipino-language films
2010s Japanese-language films
2010s Tagalog-language films
Yakuza films
Philippine crime thriller films
Philippine detective films
Films set in Metro Manila
2010s English-language films
2010s Japanese films